Gau or GAU may refer to:

People 
 Gaugericus (–626), Bishop of Cambrai
 Gau Ming-Ho (born 1949), Chinese mountaineer
 Franz Christian Gau (1790–1854), German architect and archaeologist
 James Gau (born 1957), Papua New Guinean politician
 Michael Gau, Taiwanese political office-holder
 Susan Shur-Fen Gau (born 1962), Taiwanese psychiatrist

Places 
 Gäu, name of the South German loess landscapes
 Gau (territory), German term for a shire (regional administration)
 An Administrative division of Nazi Germany
 Gäu (Baden-Württemberg), a region in the southwest German state of Baden-Württemberg
 Gaū, Iran, a village in Sistan and Baluchestan Province
 Gäu District, district of Solothurn, Switzerland
 Gau Island, an island in Fiji
 Gau Airport
 Lokpriya Gopinath Bordoloi International Airport (IATA code: GAU), in Guwahati, Assam, India

Schools 
 Georgetown American University, in Guyana
 Girne American University, in Northern Cyprus
 Gujarat Ayurved University, in India
 University of Göttingen, in Germany

Other uses 
 Gau (Final Fantasy VI), a character in Final Fantasy VI
 GAU, a codon for the amino acid aspartic acid
 Gouais blanc, a French wine grape 
 Enfariné noir, a French wine grape
 General Assistance Unemployable, a Washington state unemployment program
 Kondekor, a variety of the Ollari language with ISO 639-3 code gau
 Gau, a Cantonese vulgar word
 Glavnoe Artilleriyskoe Upravlenie, a division of the Russian military that played a significant role in the history of radar

See also 
 Gau Mata, a sacred cow in Hinduism